Pelléas and Mélisande is a Symbolist play by Maurice Maeterlinck.

Pelléas and Mélisande may also refer to several adaptations:

Pelléas et Mélisande (opera), a 1902 opera by Claude Debussy
Pelleas und Melisande (Schoenberg), a symphonic poem by Arnold Schoenberg
Pelléas et Mélisande (Fauré), a suite written by Gabriel Fauré for the Maeterlinck play
Pelléas et Mélisande (Sibelius), incidental music written by Jean Sibelius
Pelléas et Mélisande (Herbert von Karajan recording)
Pelléas and Mélisande, a musical suite by composer William Wallace, which predates the more well-known settings
Pelléas and Mélisande, a ballet choreographed by Roland Petit with music by Arnold Schoenberg which debuted in 1969 at the Royal Opera House, London

See also
Melisande (disambiguation)
Pelleas, an Arthurian Knight of the Round Table
Phileas (disambiguation)